These are the Official Charts Company's UK Official Indie Chart number-one hits of 1999.

See also
1999 in music

References

United Kingdom Indie Singles
Indie 1999
UK Indie Chart number-one singles